Hubert Kós (born 28 March 2003) is a Hungarian swimmer. He competed in the men's 200 metre individual medley at the 2020 Summer Olympics. In the semifinals of the men's 200 metre individual medley event of the 2020 European Aquatics Championships he set a new World Junior Record with a time of 1:56.99. At the 2021 European Short Course Championships, conducted at the Palace of Water Sports in Kazan, Russia, he won the bronze medal in the 400 metre individual medley with a time of 4:03.16.

At the 2022 European Aquatics Championships, held in Rome, Italy, 19-year-old Kós won the gold medal in the 200 metre individual medley with a time of 1:57.72.

On 3 March, at the 2023 Pac-12 Conference Championships at King County Aquatic Center in Federal Way, United States, Kós won the bronze medal in the 400 yard individual medley with a time of 3:37.68. The day before, he placed tenth overall, second in the b-final, in the 200 yard individual medley with a time of 1:42.37. Day four of four overall, 4 March, he placed fourth in the 200 yard backstroke with a time of 1:39.21, which was 2.27 seconds behind gold medalist Destin Lasco of the California Golden Bears.

Swimming World Cup circuits
The following medals Kós has won at Swimming World Cup circuits.

References

External links

2003 births
Living people
Hungarian male swimmers
Olympic swimmers of Hungary
Swimmers at the 2020 Summer Olympics
21st-century Hungarian people
European Aquatics Championships medalists in swimming